Bolludərə (also, Bollydərə) is a village and municipality in the Shaki Rayon of Azerbaijan.  It has a population of 412.

References 

Populated places in Shaki District